This article is about the 20 local government areas by population in the Nigerian state of Ogun. They range from 55,093 to 539,170 in population.

However, Governor Ibikunle Amosun on March 10, 2016 sent an executive bill to the House to restructure the existing 20 local government councils and create additional 37 LCDAs.

With the passage of the bill into law, there are 57 Local Government Areas & Local Council Development Areas in the state. 
The newly created ones asterisked

1. Abeokuta North Akomoje
2 * Abeokuta North West Lafenwa
3*. Abeokuta North East Ita Iyalode
4.* Oke Ogun Imala
5. Abeokuta South Ake
6.*Abeokuta South East Ijeun Titun
7*.Abeokuta South West Ijeja
8.Ado Odo/ Ota Ota
9.*Ado Odo Ado Odo
10*.Agbara/Igbesa Igbesa
11.*Ota West Atan Ota
12*.Sango/ Ijoko Sango
13.Ewekoro. Itori
14.*Ewekoro North Wasinmi
15.Ifo Ifo
16*. Ifo Central Agbado
17.*Coker Ibogun Ibogun
18.* Ifo South Ojodu
19.Ijebu East Ogbere
20*.Ijebu East Central Ojowo
21.Ijebu North Ijebu Igbo
22*.Ijebu North Central Oru
23.* Ijebu Igbo West Ojowo
24.*Ago Iwoye Ibipe
25.Ijebu North East Atan
26.*Yemoji Ilese
27.Ijebu Ode Ijebu Ode
28.* Ijebu Ode South Oke Aje
29.Ikenne Ikenne
30.*Remo Central Iperu
31.Imeko Imeko
32.*Afon Oloka Afon
33.Ipokia Ipokia
34.* Ipokia West Ijofin
35.*Idi Iroko Idi Iroko
36.Obafemi Owode Owode
37.*Oba Oba
38.*Obafemi Obafemi
39.*Ofada/ Mokoloki Mowe
40.Odeda Odeda
41.*Opeji Opeji
42.*Ilugun Ilugun
43.Odogbolu Odogbolu
44.*Leguru Ala
45.*Ifesowapo Imodi
46.Ogun Waterside Abigi
47.*Ogun Waterside East Bolorunduro Efire
48.Remo North Isara
49.*Remo North East Ode Remo
50. Sagamu Central Sagamu
51.*Sagamu Remo West Makun
52.*Sagamu Remo South Sotubo
53.Yewa North Ayetoro
54.*Iju Iboro
55.*Ketu Tata
56.Yewa South Ilaro
57.*Yewa South East Oke Odan.

However, during his government, Governor Dapo Abiodun has not attempt to utilise The local council development  Areas, (LCDAs) created, by Ex- Governor lbikunle Amosu. Rather, he maintain the formal and original 20 Local governments (LG) of the state.

See Local government areas of Nigeria, and Ogun State.

References 
Population Distribution by Sex, State, LGAs and Senatorial Districts: 2006 Census Priority Tables Vol.3, National Population commission Nigeria, published April 2010, retrieved 24 June 2013
, PM NEWS MEDIA Nigeria published May 6. 2016

 
Nigeria geography-related lists
Lists by population